WEX Inc. is a provider of payment processing and information management services to the United States commercial and government vehicle fleet industry. The company is headquartered in Portland, Maine and provides services in the United States, Canada, South America, Europe, Asia, and Australia.

History 
The company traces its origins to A.R. Wright, a coal and later heating oil business in South Portland, Maine. In the 1980s, A.R. Wright began allowing trucks to fuel up without having to pay an attendant by using a post-paid fuel card, leading to the creation of Wright Express Corporation in 1983.

Wright Express grew over the next several decades. It went public in 2005. In 2012, it adopted the name WEX, signaling a shift away from focusing on fuel cards and expanding into other payment solutions.

In 2019, WEX opened a new 100,000-square-foot headquarters across from the Ocean Gateway International Marine Passenger Terminal in Portland, Maine. The company continues to have a significant presence in South Portland. WEX is one of ten founding corporate partners of the Roux Institute at Northeastern University, which leases a portion of the WEX headquarters campus.

Operations
WEX Fleet provides vehicle fleet customers with fuel cards and data and telematics offerings for drivers. In 2012, WEX Fleet acquired Fleet One to provide fleet cards to drivers. WEX Fleet also partners with GasBuddy, OnDeck Capital, and Chevron, among other companies, to provide services to customers. In 2017, WEX Fleet launched a new telematics platform, ClearView Advanced.

The travel segment, WEX Virtual, helps online travel agencies facilitate cross-border payments through virtual cards, allowing online travel agencies to automate back-end accounting practices. WEX Virtual launched in 2000  in support of customers including HitchHiker, HotelTonight, Expedia, and Priceline.

In 2014, WEX acquired Evolution1, a cloud-based health industry payments provider, later renaming it to WEX Health. WEX Health Cloud helps to administer HSAs, HRAs, FSAs, VEBAs, COBRA, defined-contribution, wellness plans, and transit plans. Some partners include Fifth Third Bancorp, Paychex, HSA Bank, and Discovery Benefits.

In January 2020, the company announced it would acquire travel payments companies eNett and Optal from Travelport for $577.5 million.

References

External links

Companies listed on the New York Stock Exchange
Service companies of the United States
Companies based in Cumberland County, Maine
South Portland, Maine
2005 initial public offerings